Girmaye Gabre (born 5 July 1950) is an Ethiopian boxer. He competed in the men's lightweight event at the 1972 Summer Olympics.

References

1950 births
Living people
Ethiopian male boxers
Olympic boxers of Ethiopia
Boxers at the 1972 Summer Olympics
Place of birth missing (living people)
Lightweight boxers